Jean de Bourgogne may refer to:

John II, Count of Nevers (1415–1491), French nobility
John IV, Duke of Brabant (1403–1427), Flemish nobility
John the Fearless (1371–1419), Burgundian nobility
John Mandeville, supposed medieval travel writer
John of Burgundy, Bishop of Cambrai (1404–1479)
Juan de Borgoña (c. 1470–1534), Spanish painter